Allen Raymond Shearer (born October 5, 1943 in Seattle, Washington) is an American composer and baritone.

Life 
Shearer’s early musical experiences were as a singer; the majority of his works are for the voice or voices, with a later emphasis on opera. With his first wife, pianist Barbara Shearer (1936–2005), Shearer's performances included art songs, some of which were his own. He studied at the University of California at Berkeley, where he earned a Ph.D. in 1972, and at the Mozarteum in  Salzburg, Austria where he received diplomas in concert singing and opera. He taught voice in Special Programs at the University of California at Berkeley.
Among his composition teachers were Fred Lerdahl, Seymour Shifrin, Andrew Imbrie and Max Deutsch, with whom he studied in Paris. He has received many awards in music, including the Rome Prize Fellowship, the Aaron Copland Award, the Sylvia Goldstein Award, a Charles Ives Scholarship, residencies at the MacDowell Colony, and grants from the National Endowment for the Arts.

Musical style 
When asked about his musical style in the discussion preceding the 2009 premiere of his opera The Dawn Makers, Shearer answered that it varies according to the demands of the medium. Critics also describe it variously. The Harvard Biographical Dictionary of Music observes that Shearer’s music, "though it recalls postwar serialism in its rhythms and textures, relies on traditional counterpoint and on tonal centers."  Its lyric quality is frequently cited: Jeff Rosenfeld, reviewing Shearer’s Outbound Passenger, found the music "tuneful and harmonious;"  and of Shearer’s cantata King Midas, critic Robert Commanday wrote, ‘The singing lines are fluid and supple, animated, alive; the harmony and scoring for a quintet of instruments and percussion battery (two players), rich but delicately so."  In the British periodical Opera, Allan Ulrich wrote that the score of Shearer’s chamber opera The Dawn Makers has "genuine personality. The hour-long opera abounds in extended ariosos and bravura outbursts and unfurls in a conservative idiom, spiced with dissonances which neatly evade the neo-Romantic pitfalls that prevail in American opera circles."  Of the same work, Thomas Busse wrote in San Francisco Classical Voice, "The music’s greatest strength was its singability, attributable to the composer’s being a vocalist himself. I would describe Shearer’s eclectic style as more declamatory than lyrical." Of Shearer's opera Middlemarch in Spring Janos Gereben wrote in the San Francisco Examiner, "Shearer's music is pleasantly dissonant, with a sound that sticks in the ears and memory. It's ambiguous music, seemingly wondering [sic] between keys, but landing securely each time."

Recent works

Opera

Instrumental works

Choral works

Vocal works

Discography

References 

1943 births
Living people
American male classical composers
American classical composers
American operatic baritones
American opera composers
Male opera composers
20th-century American composers
20th-century American male opera singers
20th-century classical composers
21st-century American composers
21st-century classical composers
21st-century American male musicians
University of California, Berkeley alumni
University of California, Berkeley faculty
Mozarteum University Salzburg alumni
Musicians from Seattle
Singers from Washington (state)
Classical musicians from Washington (state)